Miha Terdič (born 1980) is a Slovenian slalom canoeist who competed at the international level from 1995 to 2003.

He won a silver medal in the K1 event at the 2002 ICF Canoe Slalom World Championships in Bourg-Saint-Maurice. He also won a silver medal in the K1 team event at the 2000 European Championships in Mezzana.

World Cup individual podiums

References

Living people
Slovenian male canoeists
1980 births
Medalists at the ICF Canoe Slalom World Championships